The This Is America Tour was the fifth concert tour by American recording artist Childish Gambino. The tour began in the summer of 2018, playing over 20 shows in North America and Europe.

Background
Glover announced his intention to retire the Childish Gambino pseudonym in June 2017, telling the audience "I'll see you for the last Gambino album" before walking off stage at the Governors Ball Music Festival. He further explained his decision in an interview, feeling his musical career was no longer "necessary" and added "There's nothing worse than like a third sequel" and "I like it when something's good and when it comes back there's a reason to come back, there's a reason to do that." Glover signed with RCA Records in January 2018, which Glover called "a necessary change of pace".

In May 2018, he released a single titled "This Is America" while performing dual hosting and musical duty on Saturday Night Live. The song debuted at number one, becoming both Glover's first number one and top ten single in the United States. It features him both singing and rapping, drawing influence from trap music. Its lyrics addressed a variety of topics including gun violence in the United States and being black in the United States, while its provocative video, directed by Japanese-American filmmaker and frequent collaborator Hiro Murai, featured Glover performing a series of shootings before breaking into dance.

On July 11, 2018, Glover released the EP Summer Pack which contained the songs "Summertime Magic" and "Feels Like Summer", the former of which is the lead single from Glover's forthcoming fourth studio album. The music video for "Feels Like Summer" was released on September 1, 2018, and features animated cameos from numerous prominent rappers and R&B vocalists. The video is meant to symbolize Glover's departure from the rap community and depicts his animated rendition as he walks down a neighborhood street, passing by several big names like Will Smith, Nicki Minaj, Travis Scott, Kanye West, Beyoncé, Lil Wayne, and Michael Jackson.

In September 2018, Glover made two previously unreleased songs, "Algorhythm" and "All Night", exclusively available to fans who bought tickets to his upcoming This Is America Tour. "Algorhythm" was performed at every show on the tour, and was eventually released on his next studio album, 3.15.20. "All Night" was exclusively performed at the debut show in Atlanta, and only subsequently performed at Gambino's next PHAROS events.

During the first show of the tour in Atlanta, Glover confirmed that this is the last Gambino tour ever, telling the audience: "I love you forever for supporting me and coming out for this shit. Second, if you're in here, that means you bought a ticket, so you don't need to film this shit. Experience this shit. This is not a concert. This is fucking church. If you're not here to celebrate life, if you're not here to enjoy your time here, if you're just here to hear your favorite song, you should go home right now and do that. I'm here to have an experience with y'all tonight, ya feel me?"

On September 23, 2018, Glover reportedly injured his foot during his show in Dallas, leaving the stage early and not performing an encore set.

On December 17, 2018, the final stop for the This is America Tour, Glover revealed that his father, Donald Glover Sr., passed away. He told the audience: "I lost my father a couple weeks ago and I wanted to play him some of the new songs but he didn't want to hear them, because he was like, 'I know they're going to be great.'" It was reported that he was holding back tears. Glover added, "I'm not saying that to talk about music — I say that to talk about trust. That's what love is. I hope you guys get to feel that kind of love."

A few of the songs premiered in the live shows - namely "Atavista," "All Night," and "Human Sacrifice" - would not appear on Childish Gambino's fourth studio album, 3.15.20, making them exclusive to the tour until they appear on a future musical project by Glover.

Critical reception
Althea Legaspi of the Chicago Tribune wrote that Glover "offer[ed] a sacred space where love, loss, inequality and community were explored through song", and wrote that "this may be Glover's last hurrah as Childish Gambino, but the performance made a compelling case for seeking out his next incarnation."

Karlton Jahmal of HotNewHipHop wrote that "Childish Gambino had the best concert I’ve witnesses since Yeezus, and hopefully, his retirement from touring is just a momentary lapse in judgment. A performance on this level will surely be missed."

Alex Stedman of Variety wrote that "Gambino put on a show at Los Angeles’ the Forum that was at once spiritual and electric, a celebration of an eclectic discography and, hopefully, an exciting peek at what's to come."

Charles Holmes of the Rolling Stone wrote that "The 'This Is America' Tour served as a symbolic funeral. It's a successful send-off for the Gambino moniker, and the hard-won development it represents, but not for Glover's music career. Donald Glover is still searching for himself as a musician, and made sure to provide a glimpse at what's yet to come."

Opening acts
Rae Sremmurd 
Vince Staples 
H.E.R. 
Channel Tres

Setlist
The following setlist was obtained from the concert held on September 6, 2018, at the Infinite Energy Arena in Duluth, Georgia. It does not represent every concert for the duration of the tour. 
"Atavista"
"Algorhythm"
"All Night" 
"Summertime Magic"
"The Worst Guys"
"Worldstar"
"Stand Tall" 
"Boogieman" (with "Me and Your Mama" intro)
"Riot"
"Have Some Love"
"Terrified"
"Feels Like Summer"
"Human Sacrifice" (with "39.28" intro)
"This Is America"
Encore
"Sober"
"3005"
"Sweatpants"
"Redbone"

Shows

Cancellations and rescheduled shows

Box office score data

References

2018 concert tours
2019 concert tours